Arne Ammerer (born 18 September 1996) is an Austrian professional footballer who plays for SKU Amstetten.

Club career
He made his Austrian Football First League debut for SV Ried on 28 July 2017 in a game against SC Austria Lustenau.

Honours
SV Ried
 Austrian Second League: 2019–20

References

External links
 

1996 births
Living people
Austrian footballers
SV Ried players
SKU Amstetten players
2. Liga (Austria) players
Association football midfielders
People from St. Johann im Pongau District
Footballers from Salzburg (state)
21st-century Austrian people